Bradley Michael Pitt (born 8 November 1981), also known as "Hollywood", is an Australian boxer best known for winning the Heavyweight Gold at the 2006 Commonwealth Games and for qualifying for the 2008 Olympics.

Amateur career
Because of his famous namesake, Brad Pitt is nicknamed "Hollywood". He quit his job as a painter in order to train for the 2000 Sydney Olympics, but did not qualify. He returned to painting but again quit, this time to focus on the 2006 Commonwealth Games in Melbourne.

On 6 March 2006, Pitt won the Heavyweight (199 lbs.) gold medal at the 2006 Commonwealth Games in Melbourne, after he beat Danny Price in the first round; James Wasao, Awusone Yekeni and Harpreet Singh in the final. In this fight, Pitt was taunted by Singh. Following the taunts, he knocked Singh out in three punches. On 6 August, Pitt lost at the Nationals in Darwin to 2004 Olympian Adam Forsyth 35:45.

At the 2008 World Amateur Boxing Championships Pitt lost his match to Yushan Nijiati. In 2008 Pitt qualified for the Olympics at the Oceanian Championships, beating Adam Forsyth. At the Olympics Pitt was beaten by Mohamed Arjaoui 6:11.

He was an Australian Institute of Sport scholarship holder.

Professional career
He turned pro at cruiserweight in 2011 and won his first 13 bouts including the Australian Cruiserweight title.

Professional boxing record

References

External links
 
 2006 Commonwealth Games bio
 2006 Nationals bio
 Oceanians 2008
 Brad Pitt Boxer Official website
 

Heavyweight boxers
1981 births
Living people
Commonwealth Games gold medallists for Australia
Olympic boxers of Australia
Boxers at the 2006 Commonwealth Games
Boxers at the 2008 Summer Olympics
Australian Institute of Sport boxers
Cruiserweight boxers
Australian male boxers
Commonwealth Games medallists in boxing
Medallists at the 2006 Commonwealth Games